Harold Michael Simmons II (born September 17, 1988), better known by his stage name Fyütch, stylized as FYÜTCH (or FYUTCH) (formerly named Future and Mr. Flattop), is a Grammy-nominated rapper, singer, songwriter, record producer, educator, and content creator best known for his album Family Tree and appearances on The Today Show. In 2021, he quickly became an artist to watch in children's music, releasing several charting singles on Sirius XM Radio Kids Place Live and collaborations with Divinity Roxx, Rissi Palmer, and Pierce Freelon.

Early life and education 
Simmons was born in Gary, Indiana on September 17, 1988. At age 7, he won the citywide speech contest and began gaining local popularity as a public speaker. According to his 2019 TEDx Talk, Simmons performed speeches at various events as child, including Washington, D.C. on the steps of the Congress building.  When he was 8, his family moved to Nashville, Tennessee. In 2006, he graduated from Hume-Fogg High School, where he played alto saxophone in the jazz band and volunteered for several local youth organizations. He then attended Belmont University, where he became a member of the Phi Beta Sigma fraternity, and graduated in 2011 from Belmont's Mike Curb College of Entertainment and Music Business.

Career

2006-2009: Career beginnings
In 2006, Simmons and a few of his friends started a hip hop and soul band called The Legendary Biscuits and Gravy. They were nominated for Southern Entertainment Awards Best Indy R&B Artist of the Year in 2007. They quickly gained notoriety in Nashville and opened for Kanye West, GZA, and Nappy Roots.

In 2009, Simmons released his first solo EP entitled The Sci Fly EP under the moniker Future The Artist. It received good reviews and was nominated for a Nashville Music award for Best Urban Recording of the Year. Following the EP, he released the Overnight Mixtape series, six mixtapes recorded during overnight studio sessions. The Nashville Scene spotlighted the Overnight Mixtapes, stating that Future the Artist dominated the local underground hip hop scene.

2012–2014: From Future to Fyütch
In September 2012, Future the Artist changed his stage name to Fyütch to avoid confusion with Atlanta rapper Future. March 2014, Nardwuar interviewed Future revealing that Simmons did in fact use the moniker first. "There was another Future that was out there. Started in 2003. It was this gentleman right here, Mr. Flattop, from Nashville, TN.  And he originally was called Future, then he changed his name to Mr. Flattop, and now he's called FYÜTCH. He actually was called Future in 2003 but he had to change his name because you got big."  Fyütch released a remix of Future's hit single "Move That Dope," and titled it "The Other Future (Don't Sell Dope)."  HipHopDX premiered the song as a "Future, YG, and Migos Diss." But Fyütch later refuted that claim."

2015–2018: Country Kendrick, MTV, and New York 
August 2015, Fyütch moved to New York City and won several freestyle rap competitions like Supreme Bars  and End of The Weak MC Challenge (aka EODUB).

In summer 2017, Fyütch began filming a weekly web series called Fyütchology, blending comedy, parody, and social commentary. The series gained national coverage on Episode 12 "Country Kendrick", where Fyütch remakes Kendrick Lamar songs in a country music style. The skit went viral and MTV featured it on Total Request Live hosted by DC Young Fly and Rita Ora.  Mass Appeal (media) covered the success, "nothing is currently quite as thought-provoking as watching the artist in a leather vest and cowboy hat belting out his own honky-tonk rendition of "Humble."

Fyütch started an organization called Level Up Showcase in 2018 that hosted monthly concerts for aspiring youth artists and musicians.  He received the Open Call grant from The Shed for emerging artists.  In 2020, he won the BRIO Award from the Bronx Council on the Arts for outstanding Vocal Music Performance.

2021–present: Family and children's music 
January 18, 2021, Fyütch released "Black Women in History", a song about impactful and powerful Black women throughout American history, like Fannie Lou Hamer, Ida B Wells, and Stacey Abrams.  The song features Rissi Palmer and Snooknuk, and went to No. 1 on Sirius XM Radio Kids Place Live. He released seven singles leading to his debut family music album in July 2021, Family Tree, including the song "Pick It Up" released in April for Earth Day. NowThis News, Yahoo! News and MSN covered the song, highlighting Fyütch's eco-friendly rap promoting sustainability.

"Family Reunion" featuring Divinity Roxx also premiered on the All One Tribe album in June 2021 along with twenty-four Black Family music artists known as 1 Tribe Collective. The album was nominated for Best Children's Music Album for the 2022 Grammy Awards.

January 17, 2022 (MLK Day), Fyütch appeared on The Today Show with Craig Melvin on the "Dad's Got This" segment to highlight his album Family Tree and his role as father, artist, and educator.

Awards
 2021 GRAMMY® Awards Nominee for Best Children's Music Album (with 1 Tribe Collective) 
 2020 Winner of the Bronx Recognizes Its Own (BRIO) Award - Bronx Council on the Arts
 2018 Recipient of The Shed Open Call Grant for Emerging Artists
 2016 Winner of Supreme Bars Producer Tournament in New York City (December)
 2016 Winner of End of The Weak MC Challenge in New York City (April) 
 2016 Winner of Supreme Bars MC Tournament in New York City (January) 
 2015 Winner of Supreme Bars MC Tournament in New York City (October, December) 
 2009 Nashville Music Award Nominee (Best Urban Recording of the Year) 
 2007 Southern Entertainment Award Nominee w/ Biscuits and Gravy (Best Indy R&B Artist)
 2007 and 2008 Belmont University Urban Showcase winner

Discography

Albums

EPs

Notable Singles 
"Black Women in History" [2021] 
"Pick It Up" [2021] 
"Juneteenth" [2021]

References 

1988 births
People from Nashville, Tennessee
African-American rappers
Southern hip hop musicians
Rappers from Tennessee
American hip hop record producers
Living people
21st-century American rappers
21st-century African-American musicians
20th-century African-American people